Pseudocercospora vitis is a fungal plant pathogen which causes isariopsis leaf spot.

References

External links
 Index Fungorum
 USDA ARS Fungal Database

Fungal plant pathogens and diseases
vitis
Fungi described in 1886
Taxa named by Joseph-Henri Léveillé